2010 was designated as:
International Year of Biodiversity
International Year of Youth
2010 European Year for Combating Poverty and Social Exclusion
International Year for the Rapprochement of Cultures

Pronunciation
There is a debate among experts and the general public on how to pronounce specific years of the 21st century in English. The year 2010 is pronounced either "twenty-ten" or "two thousand [and] ten". 2010 was the first year to have a wide variation in pronunciation, as the years 2000 to 2009 were generally pronounced "two thousand (and) one, two, three, etc." as opposed to the less common "twenty-oh-_".

Events

January
 January 4 – The tallest man-made structure to date, the Burj Khalifa in Dubai, United Arab Emirates, is officially opened.
 January 8 – The Togo national football team is attacked in Cabinda Province, Angola, and as a result withdraws from the Africa Cup of Nations. The attack was perpetrated by the FLEC, their first since the Angolan Civil War.
 January 10—Religious violence erupts in Jos Nigeria, which left scores dead, and many injured.
 January 12 – A 7.0-magnitude earthquake occurs in Haiti, devastating the nation's capital, Port-au-Prince. With a confirmed death toll over 316,000 It is one of the deadliest earthquakes on record.
 January 14 – Yemen declares an open war against the terrorist group al-Qaeda.
 January 15
 The longest annular solar eclipse of the 3rd millennium occurs.
 The Chadian Civil War officially ends.
 Honduras withdraws from ALBA.
 January 19 - North Caucasian Federal District was split from Southern Federal District by decree of Russian President Dmitry Medvedev
 January 25 – Ethiopian Airlines Flight 409 crashes into the Mediterranean shortly after take-off from Beirut–Rafic Hariri International Airport, killing all 90 people on board.

February
 February 3 – The sculpture L'Homme qui marche I by Alberto Giacometti sells in London for £65 million (US$103.7 million), setting a new world record for a work of art sold at auction.
February 10 – The Australian government is hit by cyberattacks from freedom of expression activists, following recent Australian pornography restrictions.
 February 12–28 – The 2010 Winter Olympics are held in Vancouver and Whistler, Canada.
 February 15 – Two trains collide in the Halle train collision in Halle, Belgium, killing 19 and injuring 171 people.
 February 18 – The President of Niger, Mamadou Tandja, is overthrown after a group of soldiers storms the presidential palace and form a ruling junta, the Supreme Council for the Restoration of Democracy headed by chef d'escadron Salou Djibo.
 February 27 – An 8.8-magnitude earthquake occurs in Chile, triggering a tsunami over the Pacific and killing at least 525. The earthquake is one of the largest in recorded history.

March
 March 16 – The Kasubi Tombs, Uganda's only cultural World Heritage Site, are destroyed by fire.
 March 22 – Four-year-old Paulette Gebara Farah disappears from her family's home located in Huixquilucan, State of Mexico.
 March 26 – The ROKS Cheonan, a South Korean Navy ship carrying 104 personnel, sinks off the country's west coast, killing 46. In May, an independent investigation 2010 like a 2011 one. blames North Korea, which denies the allegations.

April
 April 3 – The first iPad was released.
 April 7 – Kyrgyz President Kurmanbek Bakiyev flees the country amid fierce anti-government riots in the capital, Bishkek.
April 5 – Julian Assange leaks footage of a 2007 airstrike in Iraq titled "Collateral Murder" on the website WikiLeaks.
 April 10 – The President of Poland, Lech Kaczyński, is among 96 killed when their airplane crashes near Smolensk, Russia.
 April 14 – Volcanic ash from one of several eruptions beneath Mount Eyjafjallajökull, an ice cap in Iceland, begins to disrupt air traffic across northern and western Europe.
 April 20 – The Deepwater Horizon oil drilling platform explodes in the Gulf of Mexico, killing 11 workers. The resulting Horizon oil spill, one of the largest in history, spreads for several months, damaging the waters and the United States coastline, and prompting international debate and doubt about the practice and procedures of offshore drilling.
 April 27 – Standard & Poor's downgrades Greece's sovereign credit rating to junk 4 days after the activation of a €45-billion EU–IMF bailout, triggering the decline of stock markets worldwide and of the euro's value, and furthering a European sovereign debt crisis.

May
 May 1 – Expo 2010 is held in Shanghai, China.
 May 2 – The eurozone and the International Monetary Fund agree to a €110 billion bailout package for Greece. The package involves sharp Greek austerity measures.
 May 4 – Nude, Green Leaves and Bust by Pablo Picasso sells in New York for US$106.5 million, setting another new world record for a work of art sold at auction.
 May 6 – The 2010 Flash Crash, a trillion-dollar stock market crash, occurs over 36 minutes, initiated by a series of automated trading programs in a feedback loop.
 May 7
 Chile becomes the 31st member of the OECD.
 Scientists conducting the Neanderthal genome project announce that they have sequenced enough of the Neanderthal genome to suggest that Neanderthals and humans may have interbred.
 May 12 – Afriqiyah Airways Flight 771 crashes at runway at Tripoli International Airport in Libya, killing 103 of the 104 people on board.
 May 19 – Protests in Bangkok, Thailand, end with a bloody military crackdown, killing 91 and injuring more than 2,100.
 May 20
 Scientists announced that they have created a functional synthetic genome.
 Five paintings worth €100 million are stolen from the Musée d'Art Moderne de la Ville de Paris.
 May 22 – Air India Express Flight 812 overshoots the runway at Mangalore International Airport in India, killing 158 and leaving 8 survivors.
 May 25–29 – The Eurovision Song Contest 2010 takes place in Oslo, Norway, and is won by German entrant Lena with the song "Satellite".
 May 28 – the 2010 Ahmadiyya mosques massacre in Lahore, Punjab, Pakistan, killed 94 people during Friday prayers at two mosques.
 May 31 – Nine activists are killed in a clash with soldiers when Israeli Navy forces raid and capture a flotilla of ships attempting to break the Gaza blockade.

June
 June 9 – The Chicago Blackhawks win their first Stanley Cup since 1961.
 June 10–14 – Ethnic riots in Kyrgyzstan between Kyrgyz and Uzbeks result in the deaths of hundreds.
 June 11 – July 11 – The 2010 FIFA World Cup is held in South Africa, and is won by Spain.
 June 18 – Toy Story 3, the highest-grossing film of the year, is released by Walt Disney Pictures and Pixar Animation Studios.
 June 24 – Julia Gillard is elected unopposed in a Labor Party leadership ballot and sworn in as the first female Prime Minister of Australia following the resignation of Kevin Rudd.

July
 July 8 – The first 24-hour flight by a solar-powered plane is completed by the Solar Impulse.
 July 13 – Microsoft ends extended support for Windows 2000.
 July 16 – First (test) Instagram posts made by co-developers Mike Krieger and Kevin Systrom in San Francisco; the service launches publicly on October 6.
 July 21 – Slovenia becomes the 32nd member of the OECD.
July 23 – British-Irish boyband One Direction is formed.
 July 25 – WikiLeaks, an online publisher of anonymous, covert, and classified material, leaks to the public over 90,000 internal reports about the United States-led involvement in the War in Afghanistan from 2004 to 2010.
 July 28 – Airblue Flight 202 crashes near Islamabad, Pakistan, killing all 152 people on board.
 July 29 – Heavy monsoon rains begin to cause widespread flooding in the Khyber Pakhtunkhwa province of Pakistan. Over 1,600 are killed, and more than one million are displaced by the floods.
PDVAL affair, also known as the Pudreval affair, political scandal in Venezuela where tons of rotten food supplies were found torrent, which imported during Hugo Chávez's government through subsidies of state-owned enterprise PDVAL.

August
 August 10 – The World Health Organization declares the H1N1 influenza pandemic over, saying worldwide flu activity has returned to typical seasonal patterns.
 August 16 – AIRES Flight 8250, A Boeing 737-700, crashed on landing at San Andrés, Colombia.
 August 21 – 2010 Australian federal election: Julia Gillard's Labor Government is re-elected, narrowly defeating the Liberal/National Coalition led by Tony Abbott.

September
 September 4 – A 7.1 magnitude earthquake rocks Christchurch, New Zealand causing large amounts of damage but no direct fatalities. It is the first in a series of earthquakes between 2010 and 2012 that resulted in the deaths of 187 people and over $40 billion worth of damage. Seismologists noted that the earthquake sequence was highly unusual, and likely to never happen again anywhere else in the world.
 September 7 – Israel becomes the 33rd member of the OECD.
September 22 – Anonymous initiates Operation Payback, a coordinated cyberattack on multiple corporations, law firms, and politicians over the banning of file-sharing websites such as LimeWire and The Pirate Bay and also the politicians and financial institutions against WikiLeaks, a whistleblower website.

October
 October 3 – Germany makes final reparation payment for World War I.
 October 3–14 – 2010 Commonwealth Games takes place in Delhi, India.
October 4 – An industrial accident at a caustic waste reservoir chain took place at the Ajkai Timföldgyár alumina plant in Ajka, Veszprém County, in western Hungary.[3][4] On 4 October 2010, at 12:25 CEST (10:25 UTC), the northwestern corner of the dam of reservoir number 10 collapsed, freeing approximately one million cubic metres (35 million cubic feet) of liquid waste from red mud lakes. The mud was released as a 1–2 m (3–7 ft) wave, flooding several nearby localities, including the village of Kolontár and the town of Devecser.[Ten people died, and 150 people were injured. About 40 square kilometres (15 sq mi) of land were initially affected. The spill reached the Danube on 7 October 2010.
October 6 – Instagram was launched.
 October 10 – The Netherlands Antilles are dissolved, with the islands being split up and given a new constitutional status.
 October 12 – The Finnish Yle TV2 channel's Ajankohtainen kakkonen current affairs program featured controversial Homoilta episode (literally "gay night"), which led to the resignation of almost 50,000 Finns from the Evangelical Lutheran Church.
 October 22 
The International Space Station surpasses the record for the longest continuous human occupation of space, having been continuously inhabited since November 2, 2000 (3641 days).
The 2010 Iraq War Documents leak occurs, being deemed the biggest US government leak in history. WikiLeaks being responsible for revealing 391832 documents concerning the 2003 Iraq War which revealed approximately 60% of the Iraqi deaths were civilian casualties, the Iraq War body count project showing the casualty percentage is closer to 80%.
 October 23 – In preparation for the Seoul summit, finance ministers of the G-20 agree to reform the International Monetary Fund and shift 6% of the voting shares to developing nations and countries with emerging markets.
 October 25 – An earthquake and consequent tsunami off the coast of Sumatra, Indonesia, kills over 400 people and leaves hundreds missing.
 October 26 – Repeated eruptions of Mount Merapi volcano in Central Java, Indonesia, and accompanying pyroclastic flows of scalding gas, pumice, and volcanic ash descending the erupting volcano kill 353 people and force hundreds of thousands of residents to evacuate.
 October 28 – Dilma Rousseff is elected, becoming the first (and, so far, the only) female president from Brazil.
 October 31 – Expo 2010 concludes in Shanghai, China.

November
 November 4 – Aero Caribbean Flight 883 crashes in central Cuba, killing all 68 people on board.
 November 11–12 – The G-20 summit is held in Seoul, South Korea. Korea becomes the first non-G8 nation to host a G-20 leaders summit.
 November 13 – Burmese opposition politician Aung San Suu Kyi is released from her house arrest after being incarcerated since 1989.
 November 14 – Sebastian Vettel became the youngest F1 Champion after a 4 way championship fight 
 November 17 – Researchers at CERN trap 38 antihydrogen atoms for a sixth of a second, marking the first time in history that humans have trapped antimatter.
 November 20 – Participants of the 2010 NATO Lisbon summit issue the Lisbon Summit Declaration.
 November 21 – Eurozone countries agree to a rescue package for the Republic of Ireland from the European Financial Stability Facility in response to the country's financial crisis.
 November 23 – North Korea shells Yeonpyeong Island, prompting a military response by South Korea. The incident causes an escalation of tension on the Korean Peninsula and prompts widespread international condemnation. The United Nations declares it to be one of the most serious incidents since the end of the Korean War.
 November 28 – WikiLeaks releases a collection of more than 250,000 American diplomatic cables, including 100,000 marked "secret" or "confidential".
 November 29 – The European Union agree to an €85 billion rescue deal for Ireland from the European Financial Stability Facility, the International Monetary Fund and bilateral loans from the United Kingdom, Denmark and Sweden.
 November 29 – December 10 – The 2010 United Nations Climate Change Conference is held in Cancún, Mexico. Also referred to as the 16th Conference of the Parties of the United Nations Framework Convention on Climate Change (COP 16), it serves too as the 6th meeting of the Parties to the Kyoto Protocol (CMP 6).

December
 December – Comet Hale Bopp was found again around 30.7 AU away from the Sun. The previous time the Comet was found was in April 1997.
 December 9 – Estonia becomes the 34th member of the OECD.
 December 17 – The attempted suicide of Mohamed Bouazizi, a street vendor in Tunisia, triggers the Tunisian Revolution and the wider Arab Spring throughout the Arab world.
 December 21 – The first total lunar eclipse to occur on the day of the Northern winter solstice and Southern summer solstice since 1638 takes place.

Full date unknown
 D'Wäschfra (2010) satire newspaper is published in Luxembourg.

Births and Deaths

Nobel Prizes

 Chemistry – Richard F. Heck, Ei-ichi Negishi and Akira Suzuki
 Economics – Peter A. Diamond, Dale T. Mortensen and Christopher A. Pissarides
 Literature – Mario Vargas Llosa
 Peace – Liu Xiaobo
 Physics – Andre Geim and Konstantin Novoselov
 Physiology or Medicine – Robert G. Edwards

New English words and terms
Arab spring
gamification
libfix

See also

References